Renato Curi Angolana,  is an Italian association football club located in Città Sant'Angelo, Abruzzo. It currently plays in Eccellenza.

History
The club was founded in 1998 after the merger of Renato Curi, same name of a footballer of Perugia who suddenly died in 1977 during a league match against Juventus (founded in 1978 in Pescara  playing in Eccellenza Abruzzo) and Angolana (founded in 1948 in Città Sant'Angelo playing in Promozione Abruzzo).

In the 2004-2005 season, they were promoted to Serie D from Eccellenza Abruzzo. 
In the 2013-2014 season, the club returned to Eccellenza from Serie D.

Colors and badge
Its colors are black and blue.

Famous players

Massimo Oddo
Fabio Grosso
Ernesto Terra
Raffaele Biancolino
Andrea D'Agostino
Alessandro Del Grosso
Matteo Ciofani
Marco Capuano
Alessandro Iacobucci
Carlo Luisi

References

External links
 Official homepage

Association football clubs established in 1998
Football clubs in Abruzzo
1998 establishments in Italy